Lismire GAA is a Gaelic Athletic Association club based in the village of Lismire in the northwest of County Cork, Ireland which forms part of the parish of Kanturk and Lismire. The club plays in the Duhallow division in both Gaelic football and hurling competitions. Lismire GAA club was founded in 1972. The club purchased and developed a stadium which opened in 1982, and erected a hall and dressing room complex in 1986. As of 2022, Lismire compete in the Duhallow Junior A Football Championship.

Honours
 Duhallow Junior A Hurling Championship
  Winners (4): 1983, 1984, 1985, 1987
  Runners-Up (1): 1990
 Cork Junior B Hurling Championship
  Runners-Up (1): 2004 
 Duhallow Junior B Football Championship 
  Winners (3): 1981, 2016, 2022
Cork Junior C Football Championship
  Runners-Up (1): 2021
Duhallow Junior B2 Football Championship 
  Winners (1): 2021

References

Gaelic games clubs in County Cork
Gaelic football clubs in County Cork